Dulcé Lazaria Sloan (born July 4, 1983) is an American stand-up comedian, actress and writer. She is a correspondent for The Daily Show with Trevor Noah on Comedy Central.

Early life and education 
Sloan was born in Miami, Florida, and spent most of her childhood in Atlanta, Georgia, and Miami. She graduated from Meadowcreek High School in 2001.

Sloan attended Brenau University and earned a Bachelor of Arts in Theatre Performance. She minored in Spanish. She is a member of Alpha Psi Omega.

Career 
Sloan started performing stand-up comedy in May 2009 after being encouraged by friends who worked at the Funny Farm Comedy Club.

In 2015, she was named a "New Face of Comedy" at the Just For Laughs comedy festival and won the 12th annual StandUp NBC comedy showcase. Her late-night comedy debut followed on Conan in February 2016. A few months later, she won the 2016 Big Sky Comedy Festival in Billings, Montana. Additional TV appearances followed on Comedy Knockout, The Steve Harvey Show., @midnight with Chris Hardwick, and as a correspondent for E! News Daily. Sloan joined The Daily Show as a correspondent in September 2017. Her Comedy Central Stand-Up Presents episode aired in October 2019. She co-hosted the Central Time Zone  hour of CNN's New Year's Eve Live along with Don Lemon in 2021.

In voice work, Sloan is the voice of Honeybee in the Fox animated sitcom The Great North and has been a panelist on the radio show Wait Wait... Don't Tell Me!.

Personal life 
Sloan is the niece of Freestyle singer Stevie B.

Filmography

Film

Television

Awards and honors 
2015: Just for Laughs New Faces of Comedy
2015: Stand-Up NBC comedy showcase winner
2016: Big Sky Comedy Festival winner
2017: Rolling Stone 10 Comedians You Need to Know
2017: Brenau Alumni Hall of Fame inductee
2018: Variety 10 Comics to Watch

References

External links

Living people
American women comedians
21st-century American comedians
American stand-up comedians
African-American stand-up comedians
21st-century American actresses
American television actresses
Actresses from Atlanta
Comedians from Georgia (U.S. state)
Actresses from Miami
Comedians from Florida
1983 births
21st-century African-American women
21st-century African-American people
20th-century African-American people
20th-century African-American women
African-American female comedians